Ronald William Harris (16 January 1924 – 9 December 2006) was an Australian rules footballer who played with Hawthorn in the Victorian Football League (VFL).

Notes

External links 

1924 births
2006 deaths
Australian rules footballers from Melbourne
Hawthorn Football Club players
People from Hawthorn, Victoria